WTEL may refer to:

 WTEL (AM), a radio station (610 AM) licensed to serve Philadelphia, Pennsylvania, United States
 WCHZ (AM), formerly registered as WTEL, a radio station in Augusta, Georgia, United States
 WRDW (AM), formerly registered as WTEL, a radio station in Augusta, Georgia, United States
 WWDB, formerly registered as WTEL, a radio station in Bala Cynwyd, Pennsylvania, United States
 WYDU, formerly registered as WTEL, a radio station in Red Springs, North Carolina, United States